Richard Meyer may refer to:
 Richard Meyer (composer) (born 1957), American composer, teacher, and strings editor
 Richard Meyer (academic) (born 1966), writer and professor of art history at Stanford University
 Richard Meyer (Fatal Fury), a character in the Fatal Fury fighting video games
 Richard Meyer (folk music) (1952–2012), American folk musician and writer/editor of folk publications
 Richard Meyer (mathematician) (1919–2008), German mathematician and aerospace engineer
 Richard Meyer (producer) (born 1970), Swiss record producer and songwriter
 Richard Meyer (tennis) (born 1955), American tennis player
 Richard A. Meyer, American businessman
 Richard C. Meyer (1920–1985), German-American television and film editor
 Richard C. Meyer, American Comicsgate leader
 Richard E. Meyer (1939–1992), American businessman and record producer

See also
Richard Mayer (disambiguation)
Dick Mayer (1924–1989), golfer
Richard Meier (born 1934), American architect
Richard L. Meier (1920–2007), American regional planner, systems theorist, scientist, urban scholar, and futurist
Ric Meyers (born 1953), contributor to the Martial Arts film industry, and FanimeCon panelist